The History of Armenia (Patmutyun Hayots) attributed to Movses Khorenatsi is an early account of Armenia, covering the legendary origins of the Armenian people as well as Armenia's interaction with Sassanid, Byzantine and Arsacid empires down  to the 5th century.

It contains unique material on ancient Armenian legends, and such information on pagan (pre-Christian) Armenian as has survived. It also contains plentiful data on the history and culture of contiguous countries. The book had an enormous impact on Armenian historiography. 
In the text, the author self-identifies as a disciple of Saint Mesrop, and states that he composed his work at the request of Isaac (Sahak), the Bagratuni prince who fell in battle in 482.

Authorship

Scholars have generally accepted Movses's History as an authentic script. For example, Gibbon in his History of the Decline and Fall of the Roman Empire (ch. 32) accepted the 5th century date of Movses, on grounds that "his local information, his passions and his prejudices, are strongly expressive of a native and contemporary."

Contents
The book is divided into three parts: 
 "Genealogy of Armenia Major", encompassing the history of Armenia from the beginning down to Alexander the Great;
 "History of the middle period of our ancestors", extending from Alexander to the death of Gregory the Illuminator and the reign of King Terdat (330);
 the third part brings the history down to the overthrow of the Arshakuni Dynasty (428); and
 the fourth part brings the history down to the time of the Emperor Zeno (474-491), during this time there were three wars: a. the Armenian Independence War headed by Vasak Syuni (450), b. the civilian war between Vardan Mamikonyan and Vasak Syuni (autumn of 450 - May 451), inspired by Romans, Persians and Armenian clergy, c. the 2nd independence war headed by Sahak Bagratuni (who ordered Movses Khorenatsi to write the "history of Armenia") and then by Vahan Mamikonyan (after the death of Sahak Bagratuni in 482).

Patriarchs
This first book contains 32 chapters, from Adam to Alexander the Great.
List of the Armenian patriarchs according to Moses:
Hayk (Haig) (grandson of Tiras), Armenak (or Aram), Aramais, Amassia, Gegham, Harma, Aram
Ara Geghetsik, Ara Kardos, Anushavan, Paret, Arbag, Zaven, Varnas, Sour, Havanag
Vashtak, Haikak, Ampak, Arnak, Shavarsh, Norir, Vestam, Kar, Gorak, Hrant, Endzak, Geghak
Horo, Zarmair, Perch, Arboun, Hoy, Houssak, Kipak, Skaiordi
These cover the 24th to 9th centuries BC in Moses' chronology, indebted to the Chronicon of Eusebius. 
There follows a list of legendary kings, covering the 8th to 4th centuries BC:
Parouyr, Hratchia, Pharnouas, Pachouych, Kornak, Phavos, Haikak II, Erouand I, Tigran I, Vahagn, Aravan, Nerseh, Zareh, Armog, Bagam, Van, Vahé.
These gradually enter historicity with Tigran I (6th century BC), who is also mentioned in the Cyropaedia of Xenophon (Tigranes Orontid, traditionally 560-535 BC; Vahagn 530-515 BC), but Aravan to Vahé are again otherwise unknown.

chapter 1: letter to Sahak
chapter 5: from Noah to Abraham and Belus
chapters 10-12: about Hayk
chapter 13: war against the Medes
chapter 14: war against Assyria, 714 BC
chapters 15-16: Ara and Semiramis
chapters 17-19: Semiramis flees from Zoroaster to Armenia and is killed by her son.
chapter 20: Ara Kardos and Anushavan
chapter 21: Paruyr, first king of Armenia at the time of Ashurbanipal
chapter 22: kings from Pharnouas to Tigran
chapter 23: Sennacherib and his sons
chapters 24-30: about Tigran I
chapter 31: descendants of Tigran down to Vahé, who is killed in resistance against Alexander
chapter 32: Hellenic wars

Middle Period (332 BC - AD 330)

92 chapters, from Alexander the Great to Tiridates III of Armenia.

Arsacid period 330-428

68 chapters, from the death of Tiridates III to Gregory the Illuminator.

Editions and translations

Under Soviet rule the book was published many times.

R. W. Thomson,  English translation, 1978 (Harvard).
G. Kh. Sargsyan, Russian translation, 1991.
R. W. Thomson, English translation, rev. ed. 2006 (Caravan Books).

See also
History of Armenia
Zenob Glak
John Mamikonean
Gregory the Illuminator
Roman relations with the Armenians

References

 Robert H. Hewson, "The Primary History of Armenia": An Examination of the Validity of an Immemorially Transmitted Historical Tradition, History in Africa (1975).

External links
Movses Khorenatsi, "The History of Armenia" (in Armenian)
Movses Khorenatsi, "The History of Armenia" (in English)

Medieval literature
Armenian literature
History books about Armenia